Chiropsestis is a monotypic moth genus in the family Drepanidae. Its only species, Chiropsestis rubrocinerea, is found in Vietnam and Hainan, China. Both the genus and the species were described by Gyula M. László, Gábor Ronkay and László Aladár Ronkay in 2001.

References

Thyatirinae
Monotypic moth genera
Drepanidae genera